Rebounder may refer to:

 Rebounder (basketball)
 Rebounder, a type of trampoline